Feuerspitze ("Fire-Peak") is a mountain in the Lechtal Alps of Tyrol.

⁠
⁠
⁠
Mountains of the Alps
Mountains of Tyrol (state)
Lechtal Alps